Constantin Radu (born 13 February 1912) was a Romanian long-distance runner. He competed in the marathon at the 1952 Summer Olympics.

References

External links
 

1912 births
Year of death missing
Athletes (track and field) at the 1952 Summer Olympics
Romanian male long-distance runners
Romanian male marathon runners
Olympic athletes of Romania
Place of birth missing